The 2010-11 Celtic League Grand Final was the final match of the 2010–11 Celtic League season. The final was won by Munster who defeated Leinster by 19–9 at Thomond Park to claim their third Celtic League title.

Background and Build Up 
2010-11 was the tenth Celtic League season and the fifth and final season with Magners as title sponsor. It would also prove to be the final season before the league was rebranded as "Pro12" from 2011 to 2012. The regular season began on 3 September 2010 and finished on the weekend of 6–8 May 2011. During these stages, each team played every other team both home and away and were awarded points according to the standard bonus point system. This was the second season to follow the play-off structure to determine the Celtic League champion, with the top four teams qualifying for the semi-finals. The winner of each semi final advanced to the Grand Final, which took place 28 May and was hosted by the team that finished highest in the table following the regular season, which was Munster. The previous week on 21 May, Leinster had won the 2011 Heineken Cup.
Munster fielded the same starting line-up from their 18-11 semi-final win against the Ospreys.
An ankle injury sustained in the Heineken Cup Final prevented Leinster's Gordon D'Arcy's from starting, Fergus McFadden instead started alongside Brian O'Driscoll in the centre.
Heinke van der Merwe and Shane Jennings also started for Leinster instead of Cian Healy and Kevin McLaughlin from the Heineken Cup Final team.

All tickets for the final sold out.
The match was shown live on TV in Ireland by RTÉ Two and also by TG4, in the UK the match was covered by BBC Two Wales and BBC Alba. Highlights were shown in Central and Northern Scotland on STV.

Route to the final

2010-11 Final Table
Under the standard bonus point system, points were awarded as follows:
4 points for a win
2 points for a draw
1 "bonus" point for scoring 4 tries (or more) (Try bonus)
1 "bonus" point for losing by 7 points (or fewer) (Losing bonus)

Previous 2010-11 Celtic League meetings

2011 Playoffs

Semi-finals

Match

Summary
Ronan O'Gara converted a Doug Howlett try after twelve minutes before Johnny Sexton responded with a penalty for Leinster after twenty nine minutes to leave Munster 7-3 ahead at half time.
The Munster try, which Howlett scored in the corner was the first Munster scored against Leinster since 2009. In the second half Donncha O'Callaghan was sin-binned for not rolling away and Sexton scored from the resulting penalty.
After sixty six minutes O'Gara found Keith Earls with a cross-field kick to the corner which the winger caught before stretching to ground the ball with one hand. Munster were awarded a penalty try with one minute remaining, which O'Gara converted to leave the final score at 19–9.

Details

Reaction 
Leinster coach Josef Schmidt felt that fatigue may have been a factor in their defeat to Munster in the Final. He felt that coming only a week after their Heineken Cup win their energy levels may not have been a high as Munster's, "To be honest, I kind of felt that Munster needed it more than we wanted it. They showed a lot of character, and that made it difficult for us to really keep our tempo, and play the game that we wanted to play" he said.
Munster coach Tony McGahan was delighted with his team's win saying "It’s huge for everyone right across the board, from the playing group, the management and the organisation to the development officers and young players coming through, and more important to the supporters. They can walk around with a smile on their faces, knowing that we have done something very important in the context of the Magners League season".
Munster captain Paul O'Connell said that the game was a very good thing for Irish rugby, "Both sides have a lot of leadership, and no little skill, people talk about this being a good era for Ireland".
Munster's John Hayes noted that it was important to win the knock out matches, saying “We were disappointing in Europe, but good in the Magners, you can finish the League phase of the competition on top of the table, but it doesn’t get you anything, it is important to win the knock-out matches".

References

External links 
2011 Magners League Grand Final Official Website (Archived)
2011 Magners League Grand Final at ESPN Scrum
 2011 Magners League Grand Final Photo Gallery (Archived)

2010–11 Celtic League
2010–11 in Irish rugby union
2011
Leinster Rugby matches
Munster Rugby matches